The 2016–17 Columbus Blue Jackets season was the 17th season for the National Hockey League franchise that was established on June 25, 1997. This season marked the first time the Blue Jackets were in the Stanley Cup playoffs since the 2013–14 season.

Regular season
The Blue Jackets finished October with a record of 3 wins, 3 regulation losses and an overtime loss, but in November they won 9, lost 2 in regulation and 3 in overtime.  On November 29, 2016, the team began a winning streak that ran to 16 consecutive games, including a perfect 14-0-0 record in December, but ended on January 5, 2017 with a loss to the Washington Capitals. The 16 game winning streak was one short of the NHL record 17 games, set by the 1992–93 Pittsburgh Penguins.

Standings

Schedule and results

Pre-season

Regular season

Playoffs

The Blue Jackets clinched the playoffs for the first time since the 2013–14 season. They met the Pittsburgh Penguins in the first round and lost the series 4–1.

Player statistics
Final Stats
Skaters

Goaltenders

†Denotes player spent time with another team before joining the Blue Jackets. Statistics reflect time with the Blue Jackets only.
‡Denotes player was traded mid-season. Statistics reflect time with the Blue Jackets only.
Bold/italics denotes franchise record.

Transactions
The Blue Jackets have been involved in the following transactions during the 2016–17 season.

Trades

Free agents acquired

Free agents lost

Claimed via waivers

Lost via waivers

Player signings

Draft picks

Below are the Columbus Blue Jackets' selections at the 2016 NHL Entry Draft, held June 24–25, 2016 at the First Niagara Center in Buffalo, New York.

Notes
 The Columbus Blue Jackets' fourth-round pick went to the New York Islanders as the result of a trade on June 25, 2016 that sent a fourth-round pick in 2016 (110th overall) and a sixth-round pick in 2017 to Chicago in exchange for this pick.
Chicago previously acquired this pick as the result of a trade on June 30, 2015 that sent Brandon Saad, Michael Paliotta and Alex Broadhurst to Columbus in exchange for Artem Anisimov, Jeremy Morin, Corey Tropp, Marko Dano and this pick.
 The Columbus Blue Jackets' fifth-round pick went to the St. Louis Blues as the result of a trade on November 15, 2014 that sent Jordan Leopold to Columbus in exchange for this pick.

References

Columbus Blue Jackets seasons
Columbus Blue Jackets
Blue
Blue